Battle of Megiddo refers to one of the major battles fought near the ancient site of Megiddo in Palestine:
Battle of Megiddo (15th century BC), a battle between Ancient Egyptians led by Pharaoh Thutmose III and a large Canaanite coalition
Battle of Megiddo (609 BC), a battle between Egypt and Judea
Battle of Megiddo (1918), a battle between British Empire forces and the Ottoman Empire
Armageddon (Har Megiddo), the site of the final epic battle associated with end-time prophecies, and by extension, the battle itself

See also
Megiddo (disambiguation)